Dixeia piscicollis is a butterfly in the family Pieridae. It is found on Sao Tome and Principe.

References

Butterflies described in 1972
Pierini